The 1991–92 Minnesota North Stars season was the North Stars' 25th, and penultimate season in the Twin Cities area. A major aspect of the season was that several players were lost to the San Jose Sharks expansion team.

Offseason
The North Stars officially adopted a new logo for the 1991–92 season, retiring their original N logo. The new logo, featuring the word STARS set across the top of a slanted 5-pointed star, with the A forming the outline of the top point, had been introduced as a secondary mark during the prior season. Along with the new logo came new uniforms, with black as the primary color, with green and metallic gold trim. The team experimented with a Crillee typeface for the players' names during the preseason, but determined the names to be illegible, and replaced them with single-color block letters by the start of the season.

Howard Baldwin and Morris Belzberg came into conflict with fellow owner Norman Green over operation of the North Stars during the prior season, leading to Baldwin selling his stake to Green in August, and Belzberg selling to Green in October. The departing owners would then purchase the Pittsburgh Penguins from Edward J. DeBartolo, Sr. in November.

NHL Draft
Minnesota's draft picks at the 1991 NHL Entry Draft held at the Buffalo Memorial Auditorium in Buffalo, New York.

Dispersal Draft results

The Sharks selected 24 players from the North Stars.
 The reason for the Dispersal Draft was attributed the fact that a compromise was implemented for the 1990–91 season. The previous owners of the North Stars, the Gund brothers were awarded an expansion team in the Bay Area, that would be called the San Jose Sharks. The Sharks would receive players via a dispersal draft with the North Stars.

Expansion Draft results
 After the Expansion Draft, the North Stars traded Kelly Kisio to the Sharks in order to reacquire Shane Churla.

Regular season

The North Stars allowed the most short-handed goals during the regular season, with 22. This tied an NHL record set by the 1984–85 Pittsburgh Penguins.

Final standings

Schedule and results

Player statistics

Forwards
Note: GP = Games played; G = Goals; A = Assists; Pts = Points; PIM = Penalty minutes

Defencemen
Note: GP = Games played; G = Goals; A = Assists; Pts = Points; PIM = Penalty minutes

Goaltending
Note: GP = Games played; W = Wins; L = Losses; T = Ties; SO = Shutouts; GAA = Goals against average

Playoffs

Awards and records

References
 North Stars on Hockey Database

Minn
Minn
Minnesota North Stars seasons
1991 in sports in Minnesota
1992 in sports in Minnesota